The Pathans of Tamil Nadu are Urdu-speaking Muslims of Pashtun ancestry who have migrated to and settled in the South Indian state of Tamil Nadu. Their migration to the Tamil country had occurred in three main waves - first during the Madurai Sultanate between 1335 and 1378, second during the Mughal incursions into the Tamil country of the reign of Aurangazeb and the subsequent establishment of the Carnatic state and lastly, during British rule when both the Tamil country as part of the Madras Presidency and the North West Frontier Province which formed part of the Pashtun homeland, were both part of British India. Pathans in Tamil Nadu are generally called Pattan or Pattani and form a part of the larger Urdu-speaking community of Tamil Muslims. 

In Tamil Nadu, the term "Pathan" sometimes extends to all Urdu-speaking Muslim migrants from North India, regardless of whether they are of Pashtun ancestry or not. They form one of the segments of the Tamil Muslim community along with Tamil-speaking Labbais, Marakkar, Rowthers and Mappilas.

History 
The first recorded presence of Pathans in Tamil Nadu was as a part of Malik Kafur's army in the 14th century AD. A Pathan general in the service of Muhammad bin Tughluq, Jalaluddin Ahsan Khan founded the Madurai Sultanate which ruled the city of Madurai and surrounding areas for 43 years before being ousted by the Vijayanagar Empire in 1378.

Tamil Nadu was captured and occupied by Telugu Nayak Kings. Tamil Nadu saw constant invasion during this period. Marathas captured a sizeable portion of Tamil Nadu. In the late 17th century AD when Aurangazeb sent armies into Northern Tamil areas in order to conquer the territories as well as to subjugate the Marathas. The whole territory to the south of Golconda and east of Mysore was erroneously referred to by these invaders as Karnatak or Carnatic and a Mughal viceroyalty was set up by that name to govern the areas. This area covered southern Andhra Pradesh and the northern parts of Tamil Nadu around Gingee and Vellore. The first of the hereditary viceroys or Nawabs was the general Zulfiqar Khan Nusrat Jung of Afghan extraction.

In the early 18th century, Nawab Saadatullah Khan I declared himself independent and ruled the so-called Carnatic State till 1801 and existed as a practically independent kingdom till 1855. During this period, a large number of Urdu-speaking Muslim intellectuals from North India migrated to Tamil Nadu where they served in the court of the Carnatic nawabs. The state was eventually extinguished by the Doctrine of Lapse in 1855 but the Nawab retained most of his privileges and had the title "Chief Native nobleman of Madras" bestowed upon him by the Governor.

There were also smaller migrations of Afghan traders during British rule in the subcontinent. These traders were fewer in number and usually preserved their items of dress, culture and language.

Language 
The Pathans of Tamil Nadu speak Dakhni Urdu as their mother tongue. All of them are conversant in Tamil. Knowledge of Arabic and Persian is considered a scholarly accomplishment.

See also
 Pathans of Sri Lanka

Notes 

Muslim communities of India
Social groups of Tamil Nadu
Tamil Nadu
Islam in Tamil Nadu